Rachel Adedeji (born 22 August 1991) is a Nigerian-British singer and actress. She finished in ninth place on sixth series of The X Factor in 2009, having previously appeared on the fifth series. From 2016 to 2020, she appeared in the Channel 4 soap opera Hollyoaks as Lisa Loveday.

Career 
Adedeji began her career as a singer, beginning singing at the age of eight, later studying musical theater in college. She performed in many musical productions and had a role in the musical Mamma Mia!. In 2008, Adedeji entered the fifth series of The X Factor, where she made it to bootcamp. Adedeji later returned to the programme for the sixth series, where she finished in ninth place.

On 21 March 2016, it was announced that Adedeji had joined the Channel 4 soap opera Hollyoaks as Lisa Loveday, the long-lost daughter of Simone Loveday (Jacqueline Boatswain) and Louis Loveday (Karl Collins). She made her on-screen debut in April 2016. For her performance as Lisa, she was longlisted for Best Actress at The British Soap Awards in 2017. On 30 August 2017, it was announced that Adedeji was expecting her first child and would take maternity leave. Her return to the programme aired on 13 November 2018. In June 2020, it was announced that Adedeji had quit the programme, with her final scenes airing later in the year. In October 2021, Adedeji portrayed the role of April Lewin in an episode of the BBC soap opera Doctors.

Filmography

Personal life
In 2015, Adedeji married Jason Finnegan; she announced she was pregnant with the pair's first child in 2017, taking maternity leave from Hollyoaks. In 2020, Adedeji took to social media to open up about racism she has encountered while working on the programme. She stated she was told "You're all the same" by a make-up artist, and said that black actresses on Hollyoaks were "forced to drastically change their hair" after being told viewers wouldn't be able to tell them apart, and that in her four years on the soap, she had only worked with one black director. She added: "Working at Hollyoaks is mostly positive, but the experiences I have encountered are a constant reminder of how difficult it is being a black woman in the industry. I am no longer standing for it." A few days later, the soap launched an investigation into her claims, with producers stating that they were "deeply shocked and saddened" by the issues that she had addressed. The investigation included a multi-step action plan to root out any further instances of racism.

Awards and nominations

References

External links 

1991 births
Living people
English soap opera actresses
English people of Nigerian descent
English women pop singers
Actresses from Essex
21st-century English women singers
21st-century English singers